The  was an experimental monoplane fighter aircraft designed for the Japanese Imperial Army. Two prototypes flew in 1936 but the design never entered production.

Design & Development
The Ki-33 was initially produced by Mitsubishi in response to Japanese army specifications for a fighter to replace the existing Kawasaki Ki-10 biplane. In mid 1935 Kawasaki, Mitsubishi and Nakajima were instructed to build competitive prototypes. Mitsubishi, preoccupied with refining the Ka-14 into the A5M fighter and adapting the G3M bomber for series production for the Imperial Japanese Navy, lacked sufficient design capacity to develop another fighter from scratch, and therefore submitted its earlier and unsuccessful Ki-18 design, with comparatively minor changes, as the Ki-18 had proven to be a good fighter aircraft and the reasons for its rejection were based on principles rather than quality. 
An aft-sliding canopy was added, the aft fuselage decking was raised and the vertical tail surfaces were modified. The prototypes were completed during the early summer of 1936.
Service trials from November 1936 until the spring of 1937 proved that the Kawasaki Ki-28 was the fastest of the three contenders, but the Nakajima Ki-27 was by far the most maneuverable, and on this basis was selected by the Imperial Japanese Army Air Force.

Operators

 Imperial Japanese Army Air Force

Specifications

See also

References
Notes

Bibliography

Further reading
 Famous Airplanes of the World, second series, #24: Army Experimental Fighters. Tokyo: Bunrin-Do, September 1990.

External links

 Axis History Forum

Low-wing aircraft
Abandoned military aircraft projects of Japan
Ki-33, Mitsubishi
1930s Japanese experimental aircraft
Ki-033
Single-engined tractor aircraft